Digby Willoughby may refer to:

Digby Willoughby, 7th Baron Middleton (1769–1856)
Digby Willoughby (adventurer) (1845–1901), English mercenary
Digby Wentworth Bayard Willoughby, 9th Baron Middleton (1844–1922)
Digby Willoughby (bobsleigher), Lieutenant Colonel Digby Willoughby, (1934–2007) 
Michael Willoughby, 12th Baron Middleton, real name Digby Willoughby, (b. 1921)
Digby Willoughby (Conservative politician), Lord Mayor of Hull, and figure of the 1946 corruption scandal